"Take On Me" is a song by the Norwegian synth-pop band A-ha. The original version, recorded in 1984 and released in October of that same year, was produced by Tony Mansfield and remixed by John Ratcliff. The 1985 international hit version was produced by Alan Tarney for the group's debut studio album, Hunting High and Low (1985). The recording combines synth-pop with a varied instrumentation, including acoustic guitars, keyboards, and drums.

The original 1984 version "Take On Me" failed to chart in the United Kingdom, as did the second version in the first of its two 1985 releases. The second of those 1985 releases charted in September 1985, reaching number two on the UK Singles Chart in October. In the United States in October 1985, the single topped [[Billboard Hot 100|Billboards Hot 100]], bolstered by the wide exposure on MTV of director Steve Barron's innovative music video featuring the band in a live-action pencil-sketch animation sequence. The video won six awards and was nominated for two others at the 1986 MTV Video Music Awards.

 Background 
"Take On Me" originated from Pål Waaktaar's and Magne Furuholmen's previous band Bridges, who first composed a number called "The Juicy Fruit Song" when they were 15 and 16 years old. Initially the band felt the riff was too pop-oriented for their band, thus the first version of the song was more "punky" in an attempt to offset the riff. The first take of the song was inspired in part by Doors member Ray Manzarek and his "almost mathematical but very melodic, structured way of playing". Waaktaar considered the song too poppy for their intended dark style, but Furuholmen recalled thinking it was "quite catchy".

Soon after, Bridges disbanded. Waaktaar and Furuholmen relocated to London to try their hand in the music industry there, but returned to Norway after six months of disappointment. They were joined by their school friend, singer Morten Harket, who heard the song and said the keyboard riff had the character of a universal hit sound. The three lads began working on demos, including a new version of the song, which was renamed "Lesson One" before it evolved into "Take On Me". In January 1983, the band returned to London in search of a recording contract. They intended the song to show off Harket's vocal range, which led to his vocals "doing this spiralling thing".

 Recording and production 
The band moved into an apartment in London and began contacting record companies and publishing houses. After a few meetings with various A&R personnel, they signed with the publishing house Lionheart. A-ha returned to Norway to earn some money; when they returned to London, they left Lionheart out of frustration. They decided to record new demos, and chose the studio of musician and producer John Ratcliff, intending to re-record five songs. The band signed with Ratcliff, who introduced them to manager Terry Slater. With this encouragement, the band managed to complete some songs, including "Take On Me". After a few meetings, Slater signed them with Warner Bros. Records UK.

The band met with producer Tony Mansfield, an expert in the use of the Fairlight CMI, who mixed the demos with electronic instrumentation. The sound was not what A-ha had hoped to achieve, and the album was remixed again. The band rushed to release "Take On Me" as a single in the United Kingdom but the single only charted at 137, the lowest-charted of all A-ha songs. After this, Warner Brothers' main office in the United States decided to invest in the band, and gave them the opportunity to re-record the song. The song was produced using the Roland Juno-60 synthesiser for the main riff, along with the Yamaha DX7 and PPG Wave synthesizers.

The instrumentation included a Yamaha DX7 and PPG Wave, with Furuholmen playing the main melody on a Roland Juno-60. A LinnDrum drum machine was used on the second and third releases, with acoustic cymbals and hi-hat overdubbed. Harket sang the lead vocal using a Neumann U47 microphone as well as a Neve microphone pre-amp and Neve equaliser.

In 2020, former Warner Brothers UK and Reprise executive Andrew Wickham appeared in A-ha's official anniversary documentary A-ha: The Making of Take On Me, to explain how the song's success was due to several parties realising the band's true value. He detailed how the song finally became the worldwide smash hit still widely recognised today. In 1984, he was the international vice-president for Warner Bros Records America, and their A&R man in London. He said, "I got a call from Terry Slater... I couldn't believe my ears (at the band's audition) when I heard Morten Harket sing. I thought, how can somebody who looks like a film star sound like Roy Orbison? I thought, this is unbelievable."

Wickham immediately signed A-ha to Warner Brothers America, after learning several previous attempts had failed to make "Take On Me" a commercial success. The next release was not successful either and featured a very ordinary performance video. He authorised considerable investment in the band: on Slater's recommendation, renowned producer Alan Tarney was commissioned to refine the song. The new recording achieved a cleaner and more soaring sound and a coda section instead of the earlier quick fade-out; the song was soon completed and re-released in the UK, but the record label's office in London gave them little support, and the single flopped for the second time.

Wickham placed the band on high priority and applied a lateral strategy with further investment. Steve Barron directed a revolutionary rotoscoping animation music video which took six months to create, using professional artists. The single was released in the US one month after the music video, and immediately appeared in the Billboard Hot 100 and was a worldwide smash, reaching No. 1 in numerous countries.

AllMusic journalist Tim DiGravina described "Take On Me" as "a new wave classic laced with rushing keyboards, made emotionally resonant thanks to Morten Harket's touching vocal delicacy."

 Composition 

"Take On Me" is a synth-pop song that includes acoustic and electric guitars and keyboards, written at a very fast tempo of 169 beats per minute. The lyrics are a plea for love and constructed in a verse–chorus form with a bridge before the final chorus. The song is written in the key of A major with a chord progression of Bm7–E–A–D–E in the verse, A–C♯m7/G♯–F♯m–D in the chorus, and C♯m–G–C♯m–G–Bm–E in the bridge. Harket demonstrates a vocal range of over two and a half octaves. He sings the lowest pitch in the song, A2 (the tonic), at the beginning of the chorus, on the first syllable of the phrase "Take On Me". As the chorus progresses, Harket's voice hits ever higher notes, reaching a falsetto and hitting the song's highest note, E5, (the dominant) at the end. Rolling Stone has thus noted the song as "having one of the hardest-to-sing choruses in pop history". A mix of a drum machine, the LinnDrum, acoustic guitars, and electronic instrumentation serves as the song's backing track.

 Music videos 
 First video 
The first release of "Take On Me" in 1984 includes a completely different recording; this mix was featured in the first video, which shows the band singing with a blue background.

 Second video 

The second video, directed by film director Steve Barron, is the far more widely recognised video for the song. It was filmed in 1985 at Kim's Cafe (now called Savoy Cafe) (corner of Wandsworth Road and Pensbury Place, London SW8), and on a sound stage in London. The video used a pencil-sketch animation and live-action combination called rotoscoping, in which the live-action footage is traced using a frame-by-frame process to give the characters realistic movements.Keating; Pizer; Fig Leaf Software, 2002. p. 247. Approximately 3,000 frames were rotoscoped, which took 16 weeks to complete. The idea of the video was suggested by Warner Bros executive Jeff Ayeroff, who was pivotal in making "Take on Me" a globally recognised music hit. The critical and commercial result was emphatic. In addition to an incalculably high view count from heavy rotation it received on MTV when it was originally released (as well as other music television channels), the music video has received more than 1.6 billion (1,601,683,361) views on YouTube and has received a 4K video restoration with more than 9.4 million likes.

The music video was remastered to 2160p (4K) in 2019 from the original 35mm film and released on YouTube, while retaining its original URL and upload date of January 6, 2010. On 17 February 2020, the music video reached one billion views on YouTube. Prior to that date, only four songs from the 20th century had reached that elusive mark ("November Rain" and "Sweet Child o' Mine" by Guns N' Roses, "Smells Like Teen Spirit" by Nirvana, and "Bohemian Rhapsody" by Queen) — making "Take On Me" the fifth video from that time period to do so, and the first Scandinavian act to achieve this.

 Plot 
The video's main theme is a romantic fantasy narrative. It begins with a montage of pencil drawings in a comic-book style representing motorcycle sidecar racing, in which the hero (Morten Harket) is pursued by two opponents (Philip Jackson and Alfie Curtis). It then cuts to a scene in a cafe, in which a young woman (Bunty Bailey) is reading the comic book. As the woman reads, the waitress brings her coffee and the bill. The comic's hero, after winning the race, seemingly winks at the woman from the page. His pencil-drawn hand suddenly reaches out of the comic book, inviting the woman into it. Once inside, she, too, appears in the pencil-drawn form as he sings to her and introduces her to his black-and-white world which features a sort of looking-glass portal where people and objects look real on one side and pencil-drawn on the other.

Back in the cafe, the waitress returns to find the woman missing. Believing the customer left without paying the bill, she angrily crumples the comic book and throws it into a bin. This causes the hero's two opposing racers to reappear as villains, one of them armed with a large pipe wrench. The racers smash the looking glass with the pipe wrench, trapping the woman in the comic book. The hero punches one of the thugs aside and retreats with the woman into a maze of paper. Arriving at a dead end, he tears a hole in the paper wall so that the woman can escape as the menacing opposing racers close in on him and they raise their pipe wrench to his face. The woman, now back in the real world and found lying beside the bin to the surprise of cafe guests and staff, retrieves the comic from the bin and runs home where she attempts to smooth out the creases to learn what happens next.

The next panel shows the hero, lying seemingly lifeless, and the woman begins to cry. However, he then wakes up and tries to break out of his comic-book frames. At the same time, his image appears in the woman's hallway, seemingly torn between real and comic form, hurling himself repeatedly left-and-right against the walls as he attempts to shatter his two-dimensional barrier. (This scene is largely patterned after a climactic scene in the 1980 film Altered States.) He escapes from the comic book by becoming human and stands up. Smiling, the woman runs towards him.

The story is concluded in the opening of "The Sun Always Shines on T.V." music video.

 Awards 
At the 1986 MTV Video Music Awards, the video for "Take On Me" won six awards—Best New Artist in a Video, Best Concept Video, Most Experimental Video, Best Direction in a Video, Best Special Effects in a Video, and Viewer's Choice—and was nominated for two others, Best Group Video and Video of the Year. It was also nominated for Favorite Pop/Rock Video at the 13th American Music Awards in 1986.

The second music video was produced by Limelight Productions. The crew of the video were director Steve Barron, producer Simon Fields, cinematographer Oliver Stapleton, editor Richard Simpson from Rushes Film Editing, and animators Michael Patterson and Candace Reckinger.

 Influence 
The music video and song have often been referred to in cover versions, films, TV programmes and video games. The Family Guy episode "Breaking Out Is Hard to Do" includes a licensed, re-edited version of the video. Volkswagen created a television advertisement inspired by the video. The video was also one of the first to be made into a so-called literal music video. The visuals of the video were used as an homage for Paramore's music video for "Caught in the Middle". An incomplete list of pop-culture references can be found below.

 Chart performance 
"Take On Me" was originally released in 1984, mixed by Tony Mansfield, but failed to make an impact in the United Kingdom. This release peaked at no. 3 in Norway but failed to reach audiences abroad. The group re-recorded the song with the help of producer Alan Tarney, releasing the new version in 1985.

In the United States, Warner Bros. invested in the revolutionary second video for "Take On Me", which used Tarney's version of the song. The new video was released to dance clubs and television a month before the record was available in stores or played on the radio. Wide exposure on MTV helped propel the single to the top of [[Billboard Hot 100|''Billboards Hot 100]], reaching number one in the issue dated 19 October 1985 (its fifteenth week on the chart). It remained on the chart for twenty-seven weeks, and ranked ten in the 1985 year-end chart.  As of June 2014, the song has sold 1,463,000 digital copies in the US after it became available for download in the digital era.

"Take On Me" was released for the third time in the United Kingdom in September 1985. The record debuted on the UK Singles Chart at no. 55 and in late October reached no. 2, where it remained for three consecutive weeks, held off the top spot by Britain's biggest single of the year, Jennifer Rush's "The Power of Love". On 14 August 2020 it was certified gold by the British Phonographic Industry (BPI).

In Norway, A-ha's native country, "Take On Me" re-entered the VG-lista singles chart, reaching a new peak of number one, a year after it was first released. The single was largely successful elsewhere, reaching the top of the Eurochart Hot 100 for nine weeks, topping the singles charts in 26 countries, including Austria, Belgium, Germany, Italy, the Netherlands, Sweden, and Switzerland, and reaching the top three in France and number two in Ireland.

In popular culture

The song's popularity has resulted in tributes and mostly visual parodies since its release.

The song appeared in the 1997 film Grosse Pointe Blank.

Also in 2005, the song is featured in the ninth episode of season 4, titled "Breaking Out is Hard to Do", of Family Guy. When Lois asks Chris to have a carton of milk, an animated hand invites Chris in and pulls him in as the song's intro starts to play. Once inside the animated pencil world, the group leader of a-ha, Morten Harket, sings the chorus. Like in the music video, two men are chasing them both. When Chris and Harket start running away from them to a dead end, Chris pushes against the wall, crashing behind a tray of eggs.

In the 2012 series finale of the TV show Chuck, Jeff and Lester play the song in order to stop a bomb from detonating in a concert hall.

In 2013, the BBC did a visual parody of the music video for BBC Children in Need. To help promote the video, it features cameos from Sinitta, The Hairy Bikers, Cheryl Fergison, Sophie Raworth and Warwick Davis. In the same year, Pitbull released the single "Feel This Moment", featuring Christina Aguilera, which interpolates the synth riff of "Take On Me".

In the 2017, season 3 episode of The Leftovers, "G'day Melbourne," the song features prominently at various points, including in its original version during the episode credits.

In one of the scenes of the 2018 movie Deadpool 2, in which Wade Wilson (alias Deadpool) and his fiancée Vanessa meet again, an acoustic version of the song plays.

In the 2018 video game Just Cause 4, there is an easter egg that pays tribute to the song's music video, which can be found on a half-built building in a town located on the Solis Island, west of Paso Ventoso. Going down to the second floor of the building, parts of the world will change to resemble pencil sketches on white paper, similar to the music video of the song.

In a 2020 episode of The Simpsons titled "The 7 Beer Itch", Homer realizes that he has romantic feelings for a character called Lily; "the two look into each other's eyes in a psychedelic mix of animated styles." It includes a rotoscope-style segment that references the music video of the song.

In the 2020 game The Last of Us Part II, when Ellie finds a guitar in Seattle, she sings the song while playing the guitar. 

In the 2019, season 4 finale of The Magicians, the cast sings the song in a style of a hymn to honor their deceased friend.

In the 2021 holiday season, an Amazon TV commercial has a family called "The Handbell Hammerschteins" playing the opening riff on handbells.

In 2022, in season 3 of the Japanese animated series Kaguya-sama: Love Is War, a modified version of the song and its animation style was featured on the intro of episode 11. In this scene, Kaguya was looking onto a poster then Miyuki's hands invites her inside.

 Track listings 
7": MCA / MCA-9146 United Kingdom (1984)
 "Take On Me" (Original version) – 3:18
 "And You Tell Me" – 1:48
 Track 1 is produced by Tony Mansfield and remixed by John Ratcliff with A-ha.

12": MCA / MCA-9146T United Kingdom (1984)
 "Take On Me" (Long version) –  3:46
 "And You Tell Me" – 1:48
 "Stop! And Make Your Mind Up" – 2:57
 Track 1 is produced by Tony Mansfield and remixed by John Ratcliff.

7": MCA / MCA-9006 United Kingdom (1985)
 "Take On Me" (Single version) – 3:49
 "Love Is Reason" – 3:04
 Track 1 is produced by Alan Tarney.
 Track 1 is the same version as the album version.

 12": MCA / MCA-9006T United Kingdom (1985)
 "Take On Me" (Extended version) – 4:50
 "Love Is Reason" (LP version) – 3:04
 "Take On Me" (Single version) – 3:49
 Track 1 & 3 are produced by Alan Tarney.
 Track 3 is the same version as the album version.

 7": MCA. / MCA-29011 United States (1985) 
 "Take On Me" – 3:46
 "Love Is Reason" – 3:04
 Track 1 is produced by Alan Tarney.
 Track 2 is produced by John Ratcliff with A-ha.

12": Warner Bros. / PRO-A-2291 (Promo) United States (1985)
 "Take On Me" (Long version) – 4:47 (a.k.a. "Extended Version")
 "Take On Me" (Single version) – 3:46
 Track 1 & 2 are produced by Alan Tarney.

 Credits and personnel 
Morten Harket – lead vocals
Magne Furuholmen – synthesisers, backing vocals
Pål Waaktaar – guitars, synthesizers, drum programming, backing vocals
Neill King – engineering (1984 version)
Alan Tarney – production
 John Ratcliff - production and re-mixing (1984 version)
Barry Grint – mastering

 Charts 

 Weekly charts 

 Year-end charts 

 Certifications 

 MTV Unplugged appearance 
In 2017, A-ha appeared on the television series MTV Unplugged and played and recorded acoustic versions of many of their popular songs for the album MTV Unplugged – Summer Solstice in Giske, Norway, including "Take On Me".

 Notable cover versions 
 Reel Big Fish version 

In 1998, ska punk band Reel Big Fish covered "Take On Me" for the film BASEketball. The song was later released on the BASEketball soundtrack and the international version of their album Why Do They Rock So Hard? The band also performs the song at concerts. Reel Big Fish released a video clip for "Take On Me", directed by Jeff Moore, and features the band playing the song while walking down an aisle in the stadium, and playing a game of BASEketball interlaced with clips from the film. An alternative video for the song's international release that contained only the stadium aisle footage was also released.  Reel Big Fish also included a live version of the song in their live album Our Live Album Is Better than Your Live Album and live DVD's You're All in This Together and Reel Big Fish Live! In Concert! Track listing 
CD single
"Take On Me" – 3:02
"Alternative Baby" – 2:56
"Why Do All the Girls Think They're Fat?" – 2:22

 Personnel 
Aaron Barrett – celesta, guitar, lead vocals, synthesizer
Grant Barry – trombone
Andrew Gonzales – drums
Scott Klopfenstein – celesta, keyboards, trumpet, vocals
Dan Regan – screams, trombone
Tavis Werts – flügelhorn, trumpet
Matt Wong – bass guitar, vocals

 A1 version 

On 28 August 2000, British-Norwegian boy band A1 released a cover of "Take On Me" for their second studio album, The A List. Despite being panned by music critics, who called it a "lame cover version" and a "note for note copy" that seems like "a re-release of the original"; it was commercially successful, topping the charts in the United Kingdom and Norway.

 Music video 
The music video was directed by Stuart Gosling. It features A1 entering a computer world by putting on virtual reality glasses after finding out about a deadly computer virus. After flying for a distance, they find the virus and destroy it, saving humanity. The video was inspired by the 1982 live-action science fiction film Tron.

 Track listings 
 UK CD1
 "Take On Me" – 3:31
 "Beatles Medley (I Feel Fine / She Loves You)" – 3:20
 "I Got Sunshine" – 3:41
 A1 multimedia trailers

 UK CD2
 "Take On Me" (UK 2K Mix) – 3:25
 "Take On Me" (Metro extended club mix) – 6:02
 "Take On Me" (D-Bop Saturday Night Mix) – 7:52
 "Take On Me" (video)

 UK cassette single
 "Take On Me" – 3:31
 "I Got Sunshine" – 3:41

 Charts 

Weekly charts

 Year-end charts 

 Certifications 

 Kygo remix 
On 27 August 2015, fellow Norwegian musician Kygo released a remixed version via iTunes to help promote the rollout of the Apple Music streaming service. His version foregoes the iconic keyboard riffs and instead features a new one. The style of his version has been described as tropical house. As of April 2021, the song has amassed more than 15 million listens on YouTube and 36 million listens on Spotify. The remix preserves Harket's original vocals (albeit with processing effects and a different arrangement).

 D. A. Wallach version 
A cover by D. A. Wallach was featured in the film La La Land. Wallach makes an appearance as the lead singer of a 1980s pop cover band that features Sebastian Wilder, one of the film's two protagonists. The cover was released as part of the album La La Land: The Complete Musical Experience.

 Weezer version 
American rock band Weezer included a cover version of the song in their 2019 covers compilation The Teal Album. An accompanying music video was released on 12 February 2019, in which rock band Calpurnia—led by frontman Finn Wolfhard ("Mike" in the Netflix original series Stranger Things), here, playing a younger version of Weezer's own frontman, Rivers Cuomo. The video, set in 1985 in the "Cuomo Residence", shows Wolfhard (as Cuomo) and the rest of Calpurnia, lip-syncing to the song while "rehearsing" it in the residence's living room. Near the end of the video, Wolfhard is shown sitting at a desk in his bedroom, scribbling possible names for his new band on a page of a notebook (the name Weezer is shown as option No.3). He then turns the page to draw what would become Weezer's band logo. The video also features some scenes of Calpurnia playing, filmed with the rotoscoping technique that made the original A-ha video famous. The cover version, set one pitch lower than the original version (as in A-flat major), was also used in the closing scene of The SpongeBob Movie: Sponge on the Run, wherein Bikini Bottom was turned into a "sea snail refuge".

 Lucas & Steve adaptation 
On 11 October 2019, the Dutch DJs Lucas & Steve released "Perfect", a single that greatly adopts on the music of "Take On Me". The single features on the vocals of the Dutch X Factor'' fifth season winner Haris Alagic known by the mononym Haris. Released on Spinnin' Records in the EDM and deephouse style, it was accompanied by an official music video. The song was greatly successful on the Dutch Singles Chart as well as on the Polish Airplay Chart and also appeared on the Tipparade of the Belgian charts. There was a successful "Perfect (LUM!X Remix)" released.

Track listing
"Perfect" (2:56) [Spinnin' Records]
"Perfect" (LUM!X Remix) (3:07)	[Spinnin' Records]
"Perfect" (Club Mix) (4:51) [Spinnin' Records]	
"Perfect" (Gabry Ponte Remix) (3:46) [Spinnin' Records]

Charts

References 

Bibliography

 
 

1984 debut singles
1984 songs
1985 singles
1999 singles
2000 singles
A-ha songs
A1 (band) songs
Billboard Hot 100 number-one singles
Cashbox number-one singles
Columbia Records singles
Dutch Top 40 number-one singles
European Hot 100 Singles number-one singles
Music videos directed by Stuart Gosling
Number-one singles in Australia
Number-one singles in Austria
Number-one singles in Germany
Number-one singles in Greece
Number-one singles in Italy
Number-one singles in Norway
Number-one singles in Scotland
Number-one singles in Sweden
Number-one singles in Switzerland
Reel Big Fish songs
Song recordings produced by Alan Tarney
Song recordings produced by Tony Mansfield
Songs written by Magne Furuholmen
Songs written by Morten Harket
Songs written by Paul Waaktaar-Savoy
UK Singles Chart number-one singles
Ultratop 50 Singles (Flanders) number-one singles
Warner Records singles
Weezer songs
Viral videos